Charging may refer to:

 Charging (ice hockey), when a player takes more than three steps before checking an opposing player
 Battery charger, a device used to put energy into a rechargeable battery
 Charging station, a device used for recharging the battery in an electric car
 On a timesheet, claiming time worked under a specific task or project code
 Sending an invoice

See also
 Charge (disambiguation)
 Charger (disambiguation)